Screen media may refer to:

Digital signage
Screen Media Films, a film distributor 
Screen Media (advertising company)